Herochroma yazakii is a species of moth of the family Geometridae first described by Hiroshi Inoue in 1999. It is found in north-eastern India, Nepal, northern Thailand and the Chinese provinces of Sichuan and Yunnan.

References

External links 
 A study on the genus Herochroma Swinhoe in China, with descriptions of four new species (Lepidoptera: Geometridae: Geometrinae). Acta Entomologica Sinica

Moths described in 1999
Pseudoterpnini
Moths of Asia